Derek Anderson (born 15 May 1972 in Paisley) is a Scottish former professional footballer, who played as a defender for Greenock Morton, Kilmarnock, Ayr United, Hibernian, Alloa Athletic, Queen of the South and Stirling Albion.

Anderson was appointed director of Greenock Morton's youth academy in March 2012. In November 2013, he and David Hopkin took interim charge at Morton after Allan Moore was relieved of his role as manager. He again took caretaker charge of the first team in September 2018, along with John Sutton. In December 2021, following the release of manager Gus MacPherson, Anderson once again took the reins as caretaker manager of Morton.

References

1972 births
Living people
Footballers from Paisley, Renfrewshire
Association football defenders
Scottish footballers
Greenock Morton F.C. players
Kilwinning Rangers F.C. players
Kilmarnock F.C. players
Ayr United F.C. players
Hibernian F.C. players
Alloa Athletic F.C. players
Queen of the South F.C. players
Stirling Albion F.C. players
Auchinleck Talbot F.C. players
Scottish Football League players
Greenock Morton F.C. non-playing staff
Scottish Junior Football Association players
Directors of football clubs in Scotland
Greenock Morton F.C. managers